Yan Alyaksandravich Tsiharaw (Yan Aleksandrovich Tigorev; born 10 March 1984) is a retired football player from Belarus.

Tsiharaw played for the Belarus national football team in four qualifying matches for the UEFA Euro 2008 tournament.

International goal
Scores and results list Belarus' goal tally first.

Honours
Dinamo Minsk
Belarusian Premier League champion: 2004
Belarusian Cup winner: 2002–03

References

External links
 
 

1984 births
Living people
Belarusian footballers
Belarus international footballers
Belarusian expatriate footballers
Expatriate footballers in Ukraine
Belarusian expatriate sportspeople in Ukraine
Expatriate footballers in Russia
Russian Premier League players
Ukrainian Premier League players
FC Dinamo Minsk players
FC Metalurh Zaporizhzhia players
FC Tom Tomsk players
FC Lokomotiv Moscow players
Association football midfielders